Come Saturday Morning is Liza Minnelli's second studio album for A&M Records. Released on January 26, 1969 in the United States, it contains the title track, which is taken from the movie The Sterile Cuckoo. In 1970 it was nominated for an Academy Award for Best Original Song. Minnelli herself won a nomination for her acting performance, the first of her two for Best Actress. The rest of the compositions are the same mix of mainly then-current pop/rock and singer/songwriters songs with a couple of Broadway/Vaudevillian songs that made up the previous album. In the UK it was released as Introducing Liza Minnelli.

Album information 
As she did with Liza Minnelli, when she recorded her second of three albums for A&M Records, Minnelli mostly chose to pick her songs by late '60s and early '70s pop/rock and singer/songwriters. She recorded this album in Los Angeles at the Columbia Studios and Western Studio 1 during approximately three different sessions on August 8, 29 and 30, 1968, with a subsequent retake session in Manhattan. Much like her other Capitol and A&M albums, Come Saturday Morning failed to sell or chart.

Track listing 
 "Come Saturday Morning" (Fred Karlin, Dory Previn)
 "Raggedy Ann & Raggedy Andy" (Larry Marks, Marilyn & Alan Bergman)
 "Leavin' on a Jet Plane" (John Denver)
 "Wailing of the Willow" (Harry Nilsson)
 "Nevertheless" (Bert Kalmar, Harry Ruby)
 "Wherefore and Why" (Gordon Lightfoot)
 "Love Story" (Randy Newman)
 "On a Slow Boat to China" (Frank Loesser)
 "Don't Let Me Lose This Dream" (Aretha Franklin, Ted White)
 "Simon" (Peter Allen)
 "MacArthur Park / Didn't We?" (Jimmy Webb)

Re-release 
The album was released on CD in its entirety for the first time as part of Liza Minnelli: The Complete A&M Recordings, a 2-CD set released by Collector's Choice Music in 2008. This included outtakes and previously unreleased recordings from the A&M recording sessions.

Personnel 
 Produced by Larry Marks
 Engineered by Ray Gerhardt
 Arranged by Dick Hazard, Michel Colombier, Bob Thompson, Peter Matz, 
 Original album engineers: Ray Gerhardt
 Piano on "MacArthur Park": Peter Allen
 Album design: Corporate Head
 Art director: Tom Wilkes
 Photography: Guy Webster 
 Special thanks to Donald Hahn, A&R Studios

References 

 Liza Minnelli: When It Comes Down to It.......1968–1977 liner notes by Glenn A. Baker, 2003
 Liza Minnelli: The Complete A&M Recordings liner notes by Scott Schechter, 2008
 Liza Minnelli: The Complete Capitol Collection liner notes by Scott Schechter, 2006

Liza Minnelli albums
1969 albums
Albums arranged by Richard Hazard
Albums arranged by Bob Thompson (musician)
Albums arranged by Peter Matz
A&M Records albums